Gruening may refer to :

Clark Gruening (born 1943), American attorney and politician.
Ernest Gruening (1887–1974), grandfather of Clark, American journalist and politician, governor of Alaska Territory 1939–1953, U.S. Senator from Alaska 1959-1969